Hood Rich is the fourth studio album by American hip hop duo Big Tymers. The album was released on April 30, 2002, by Cash Money Records and Universal Records. It features the single "Still Fly". It is the first The Big Tymers album not to be exclusively produced by Mannie Fresh. The album debuted at number 1 on the Billboard 200 with first-week sales of 168,000 copies and was certified Platinum by the RIAA.

Track listing

Charts

Weekly charts

Year-end charts

References

2002 albums
Big Tymers albums
Cash Money Records albums
Albums produced by Jazze Pha